This list covers all passenger railway stations and halts in the Hesse that are served by scheduled services.

Description 

 Station: current name of the station or halt.
 Type: Specifies the type of operating point, i.e. Station (Bf), station part (Bft) or Haltepunkt (a halt with no sets of points, Hp).
 Tracks: Specifies the number of platform tracks in-use. 
 City/municipality: City, town or municipality of the station.
 County (Kreis): This columns gives the rural county or urban district in which the station is located. The abbreviations for these are given below and correspond to the German number plate scheme:

 Opening: Specifies the opening period. The data refer to the initial opening of the station at its present location. Temporary closures or relocations are not included.
 TA: The stations of Hesse are integrated into three transport associations (Verkehrsverbünde): The northern part of the state is in the Nordhessischer Verkehrsverbund (North Hesse Transport Association, NVV), central Hesse in the Rhein-Main-Verkehrsverbundes (Rhine-Main Transport Association, RMV). The extreme south of the state belongs to the Verkehrsverbund Rhein-Neckar (Rhine-Neckar Transport Association, VRN). Fares that are located outside the core areas are shown in italics. This applies to the above three transport associations and the Rhine-Nahe-Nahverkehrsverbund (Rhine-Nahe Transport Association, RNN), the fares of which apply in Wiesbaden.
 Cat: The Cat column shows the current category of station as at 1 January 2018. This only applies to DB Station&Service stations and does not include stations run by private operators like the Hessische Landesbahn.
 L: Long-distance traffic stop; this is served by ICE, IC, EC and TGV services
 R: Regional traffic stop; this is served by Regional-Express, Stadt-Express and Regionalbahn services of DB as well as similar services of private operators. A partial list of the lines found in the List of rail services of the Rhein-Main-Verkehrsverbund
 S – Rhine-Main S-Bahn, Rhine-Neckar S-Bahn or RegioTram Kassel.
 Line – This column gives the railway on which the station is located. Only those routes which are still in operation are named.
 Remarks – In this column is additional information, particularly with regard to railway operators.

Station overview

See also
German railway station categories
Railway station types of Germany
List of scheduled railway routes in Germany

Notes

References

External links 

 
 
  
  
  
 

 
Hess
Rail